Kaleh Ban 1 (also Romanized as Kaleh Bān 1; also known as Dūl Gāvmīshān) is a village in Teshkan Rural District, Chegeni District, Dowreh County, Lorestan Province, Iran. At the 2006 census, its population was 138, in 27 families.

References 

Towns and villages in Dowreh County